Giuseppe Caire (born 1965 in Turin) is an Italian telecommunications engineer.

Career

Caire received his B.Sc. in Electrical Engineering  from Politecnico di Torino in 1990, his M.Sc. in Electrical Engineering from Princeton University in 1992, and his Ph.D. from Politecnico di Torino in 1994. He was a post-doctoral research fellow with the European Space Agency (ESTEC) from 1994 to 1995. He has been an assistant professor in Telecommunications at the Politecnico di Torino from 1995 to 1997, an associate professor at the University of Parma from 1997 to 1998, and a full professor with the Department of Mobile Communications at the Eurecom Institute from 1998 to 2005. In 2005 he became a professor of electrical engineering with the Viterbi School of Engineering at the University of Southern California. Since 2014 he is an Alexander von Humboldt Professor and head of the  Chair of Communications and Information Theory at the Technical University of Berlin. He is also working on practical applications at the Fraunhofer Institute for Telecommunications (Heinrich Hertz Institute). Since 2020 he is a Principal Scientist at the Berlin Institute for the Foundations of Learning and Data (BIFOLD).

He served as associate editor for the IEEE Transactions on Communications from 1998 to 2001 and as associate editor for the IEEE Transactions on Information Theory from 2001 to 2003. He served on the Board of Governors of the IEEE Information Theory Society from 2004 to 2007, was an officer of the society from 2008 to 2013, and was president of the IEEE Information Theory Society in 2011.

Research

Caire is one of the world’s most frequently cited and leading experts on communications engineering and information theory. His current research interests have a particular focus on wireless communications and include:
 Information Theory
 Channel Coding
 Source Coding
 Machine Learning for Communication Networks
 Wireless Communication Systems
 Coded Caching for massive Content Distribution

Awards

Clarivate Highly Cited Researcher in the category Computer Science 2014, 2018, 2019, 2020, 2021, and 2022.

 2022 Elected member of the Berlin-Brandenburg Academy of Sciences and Humanities
 2021 Gottfried Wilhelm Leibniz Prize
 2020 IEEE Communications Society Edwin Howard Armstrong Achievement Award
 2019 Leonard G. Abraham Prize for Best IEEE JSAC Paper
 2018 ERC Advanced Grant
 2015 Vodafone Innovations Award
 2014 Alexander von Humboldt Professorship
 2011 IEEE Communications Society & Information Theory Society Joint Paper Award
 2006 Okawa foundation research award
 2005 IEEE Fellow
 2004 IEEE Communications Society & Information Theory Society Joint Paper Award
 2003 Jack Neubauer Best System Paper Award from the IEEE Vehicular Technology Society

References

External links
 
 

Academic staff of the Technical University of Berlin
University of Southern California faculty
Italian electrical engineers
Gottfried Wilhelm Leibniz Prize winners
Fellow Members of the IEEE
Living people
1965 births
Princeton University alumni
Polytechnic University of Turin alumni
European Research Council grantees